General elections were held in the Isle of Man on 22 September 2016. Independents won 21 of the 24 seats in the House of Keys. A record number of women were elected (5, or 21% of the House).

Electoral system
Following changes to the electoral system ahead of the elections, the 24 members of the House of Keys were elected from 12 constituencies, each of which returned 2 members. Previously constituencies had varied in size from one to three seats. Election is by multiple non-transferable vote in each constituency, with voters having two votes (of which they may choose to use only one) for the two seats.

Results

By constituency

References

Isle of Man
General
Elections in the Isle of Man
Isle of Man